Colonel John Corry (8 January 1667 – 11 November 1726) was an Irish politician.

He was the son of Colonel James Corry and his first wife Sarah Anketill, daughter of Captain Oliver Anketill. Corry was educated at Kilkenny College and Trinity College, Dublin. Corry became High Sheriff of Fermanagh in 1711. In the same year, he contested successfully a by-election for Enniskillen and was a member of the Irish House of Commons until 1713. In 1719, Corry was returned for Fermanagh, the same constituency his father had represented before, and held that position until his death in 1726.

On 7 February 1702, he married Sarah Leslie, daughter of William Leslie. They had four daughters and four sons. His only surviving son Leslie was a Member of Parliament for Killybegs.

References

1667 births
1726 deaths
Alumni of Trinity College Dublin
High Sheriffs of County Fermanagh
Irish MPs 1703–1713
Irish MPs 1715–1727
Members of the Parliament of Ireland (pre-1801) for County Fermanagh constituencies